Ivan Čvorović (born 21 September 1985) is a retired footballer who played as a goalkeeper.

Born and raised in Serbia, Čvorović received Bulgarian citizenship in 2012 and subsequently opted to play internationally for the Bulgarian national football team. He earned one cap for them in a 2–1 away friendly win over Netherlands on 26 May 2012.

Club career
Born in Belgrade, Čvorović was educated in Partizan's youth academy.  His first season as senior was in 2002–03 with Partizan´s satellite club FK Teleoptik.  The following season, he moved to FK Srem Jakovo where he played a season and a half before moving to Bulgaria.

In 2004, he relocated to Bulgaria, signing a contract with Naftex Burgas. In 2007, he transferred to Chernomorets Burgas. On 6 March 2009 Minyor Pernik signed Čvorović. He took number 91. In May, just after making his debut for the Bulgarian national team, he joined Ludogorets Razgrad.

Botev Plovdiv
On 20 January 2017, Čvorović signed a 1-year contract with Botev Plovdiv. He made an official debut on 18 February during the 0-1 away win over Lokomotiv Gorna Oryahovitsa. Čvorović lost his first choice status to Daniel Kajzer during the 2018/2019 First League season and left the team in late May 2019 after the expiry of his contract.

Career statistic

International career
In 2012, Čvorović took Bulgarian nationality after having resided in the country for more than five years. He made his debut for the Bulgarian national football team in their win against the Netherlands on 26 May 2012, after coming on as a substitute for Stoyan Kolev during the second half.

Honours
Ludogorets Razgrad
Bulgarian A Group (3): 2012–13, 2013–14, 2014–15
Bulgarian Cup: 2013–14
Bulgarian Supercup: 2012

Botev Plovdiv
Bulgarian Cup: 2016–17
Bulgarian Supercup: 2017

References

External links
 
 

1985 births
Living people
Footballers from Belgrade
Bulgarian footballers
Bulgaria international footballers
Serbian footballers
Serbian emigrants to Bulgaria
Bulgarian people of Serbian descent
Serbian expatriate footballers
Association football goalkeepers
FK Teleoptik players
Neftochimic Burgas players
PFC Chernomorets Burgas players
PFC Minyor Pernik players
PFC Ludogorets Razgrad players
PFC Levski Sofia players
Botev Plovdiv players
FC Tsarsko Selo Sofia players
Naturalised citizens of Bulgaria
First Professional Football League (Bulgaria) players